The Koddaert Ladies Open was a tournament for professional female tennis players played on indoor hard courts. The event was classified as a $100,000+H ITF Women's Circuit tournament and was held in Torhout, Belgium, from 2007 to 2010. In 2010, two editions of the tournament were held, with the April-held tournament named the Telenet Open.

Past finals

Singles

Doubles

External links 
 ITF search

ITF Women's World Tennis Tour
Hard court tennis tournaments
Tennis tournaments in Belgium
Recurring sporting events established in 2007
Recurring sporting events disestablished in 2010
Defunct sports competitions in Belgium